Visa requirements for Jamaican citizens are administrative entry restrictions by the authorities of other states placed on citizens of Jamaica. As of 2022, Jamaican citizens had visa-free or visa on arrival access to 85 countries and territories, ranking the Jamaican passport 61st in terms of travel freedom according to Henley Passport Index., up from access to 83 countries and territories and a rank of 63rd in 2019.


Visa requirements map

Visa requirements

Dependent, Disputed, or Restricted territories
Unrecognized or partially recognized countries

Dependent and autonomous territories

Other territories

Foreign travel statistics
Overseas trips made by Jamaican citizens

Diplomatic Missions of Jamaica 

 Jamaica has a modest number of diplomatic missions and consulates in the world they are maintained under the umbrella of the Jamaican Ministry of Foreign Affairs and Foreign Trade. They are official representative of the government of one state in the territory of another, normally acting to assist and protect the citizens of the consul's own country, and to facilitate trade and friendship between the people of the two countries.

Non-visa restrictions

Future changes 

   – Visa free agreement was signed with in June 2017 and is yet to be ratified.
   – Visa free agreement has been signed but yet to be ratified.

See also

Visa policy of Jamaica
Jamaican passport
Foreign relations of Jamaica

References and Notes
References

Notes

Jamaica
Foreign relations of Jamaica